Miliband may refer to:

 Ed Miliband (born 1969), British politician, former leader (Sep. 2010-May 2015) of the Labour Party (UK) and current shadow cabinet member, brother of David
 David Miliband (born 1965), British politician, brother of Ed Miliband
 Marion Kozak Miliband (born 1934), Polish-born British activist, mother of David and Ed Miliband
 Ralph Miliband (1924–1994), Belgian-born British political theorist, father of David and Ed Miliband
 Sofia Davidovna Miliband (1922–2017), Russian Orientalist and Iranist, second cousin of David Miliband and Ed Miliband